Air Anglia was a wholly privately owned, independent British regional airline formed at Norwich Airport in 1970. Created as a result of a merger of three smaller operators, the new entity became an important regional scheduled carrier during the 1970s, serving the Eastern half of Britain. In 1980 Air Anglia merged with three regional rivals to form Air UK.

History

Air Anglia was the result of a three-way merger in 1970 between Anglian Air Charter, Norfolk Airways and Rig Air, three local air taxi operators based in the East of England. The new airline established its corporate headquarters as well as its main operating and engineering base at the recently established airport at  Norwich in East Anglia. At the time of formation Norwich Union became its controlling shareholder.

Air Anglia established itself as an important regional scheduled operator, as well as one of the main fixed wing operators supporting the British oil and gas industry in the North Sea during the 1970s.

In 1980 Air Anglia merged with British Island Airways (BIA), Air Wales and Air Westward to form Air UK, at the time the UK's biggest regional airline and its third-largest scheduled operator.

Commercial developments
Air Anglia commenced operations with a small fleet of Douglas DC-3 "Dakota" piston-engined airliners (see heading image) as well as a number of smaller, "executive" type of aircraft inherited from its predecessors. With these aircraft it mainly operated oil and gas industry support flights from Norwich and Aberdeen as well as Humberside Airport.

In 1971 it started internal services from Norwich to Liverpool, Newcastle, Manchester, Edinburgh and Aberdeen; and an international service to Dublin. 

In 1974 Air Anglia added a pair of Fokker F-27 Friendship turboprops to its fleet. The introduction of these turboprops into the airline's fleet coincided with the launch of the company's first year-round scheduled services from its Norwich base to Aberdeen via Humberside and Teesside as well as from Norwich to Amsterdam. The scheduled services between Norwich, Humberside, Teesside and Aberdeen allowed Air Anglia to commercially exploit the regular positioning flights it had been operating between these points since its inception. Oil and gas industry related business travellers constituted a high proportion of this traffic. The launch of Air Anglia's first international scheduled service to Amsterdam also led to the conclusion of a joint marketing agreement with Dutch flag carrier KLM, at the time the biggest resident operator and dominant scheduled airline at Amsterdam's Schiphol Airport. Under this agreement KLM agreed to host Air Anglia's new Norwich—Amsterdam scheduled service, as well as any subsequently launched scheduled services linking regional UK airports not served by the KLM group with Amsterdam Schiphol, in its reservations computer. This gave travel agents worldwide instant access to Air Anglia's connecting flights to/from Amsterdam via KLM's Global Distribution System, thereby enabling Air Anglia to improve its passenger loads on these services as well as helping KLM to boost its long-haul loads by delivering it additional transfer traffic from the UK regions to its Schiphol base.

In addition to these year-round scheduled services, Air Anglia also operated seasonal, summer only scheduled services from Norwich, Humberside and Aberdeen to Jersey. Air Anglia's seasonal Aberdeen—Jersey scheduled service was the longest non-stop scheduled operation using a turboprop aircraft in the British Isles at the time; the F27's scheduled flight time on that route was 2 hours and 45 minutes.

The addition of further Fokker "Friendship" turboprops to the airline's fleet over the coming years led to the introduction of year-round scheduled services from Aberdeen, Edinburgh, Humberside and Leeds/Bradford to Amsterdam, as well as from Edinburgh via Leeds to Paris Orly and from Aberdeen to Stavanger and Bergen.

During the second half of the 1970s Air Anglia also added a pair of Piper PA-31 "Navajo Chieftain" executive aircraft to its fleet. One of these aircraft was used to launch a new, year round "cross-country" scheduled service linking the airline's Norwich base with Newquay in South West England via Birmingham in the English Midlands and Swansea in Wales.

In 1979 Air Anglia launched a year-round scheduled service linking Gatwick with Leeds and extended its domestic year-round scheduled services to Stansted as well. 1979 also saw the introduction of the first jet aircraft into Air Anglia's fleet, when the airline inaugurated daily, year-round scheduled jet operations between Aberdeen, Edinburgh and Amsterdam as well as between Aberdeen, Newcastle and Paris, and Edinburgh, Leeds and Paris with a pair of brand-new Fokker F28 Fellowship 4000 series aircraft.

At the time of Air Anglia's merger with BIA, Air Wales and Air Westward to form Air UK in January 1980 its core fleet consisted of two Fokker F28 "Fellowship" jets and ten Fokker F27 "Friendship" turboprops. This core fleet was supplemented with additional turboprop capacity temporarily leased in from other operators such as British Midland during the annual summer peak travelling season, as well as during periods when its own fleet was undergoing maintenance.

Air Anglia hoped that the merger with BIA as well as Air Wales and Air Westward to form Air UK would help improve the merged entity's competitive position vis-à-vis its rivals by giving it a bigger network covering all parts of the UK, which would result from combining Air Anglia's year-round scheduled services linking important oil and gas industry centres in the Eastern half of Britain with BIA's scheduled operations across the Western half of the British Isles. This, in turn, would result in a significant marketing advantage over its rivals. Air Anglia also hoped that this would ultimately translate into a better financial performance as well by enabling the new airline to take advantage of the resulting greater economies of scale, which would permit it to spread its fixed costs over a greater level of activity. In addition, Air Anglia's amalgamation with BIA, a wholly owned subsidiary of British and Commonwealth (B&C), presented an opportunity for Norwich Union to sell its shareholding in Air Anglia to B&C.

Incidents and accidents
There were no recorded accidents or incidents during Air Anglia's ten-year existence from 1970 until 1980.

Fleet

Air Anglia operated the following aircraft types at one point or another during its ten-year existence:
 
Armstrong Whitworth Argosy on season hire from Airbridge Carriers.
Britten-Norman BN-2A Islander
Cessna 172
Cessna 404
Douglas DC-3
Embraer EMB-110 Bandeirante
Fokker F27 Friendship 100/200 series
Fokker F28 Fellowship 1000/4000 series
Handley Page Herald
Piper PA-23 Aztec
Piper PA-31 Navajo Chieftain
Piper PA-30 Twin Comanche.

See also
 List of defunct airlines of the United Kingdom

Notes and citations
Notes

Citations

References
  (World Airline Directory, 1970-1980)

External links

Defunct airlines of the United Kingdom
1970 establishments in England
1980 disestablishments in England
Airlines established in 1970
Airlines disestablished in 1980